Svatopluk I or Svätopluk I, also known as Svatopluk the Great (Latin: Zuentepulc, Zuentibald, Sventopulch, Zvataplug; Old Church Slavic: Свѧтопълкъ and transliterated Svętopъłkъ; Polish: Świętopełk; Greek: Σφενδοπλόκος, Sphendoplókos), was a ruler of Great Moravia, which attained its maximum territorial expansion during his reign (870–871, 871–894).

Svatopluk's career started in the 860s, when he governed a principality within Moravia, the location of which is still a matter of debate among historians, under the suzerainty of his uncle, Rastislav. In 870 Svatopluk dethroned Rastislav, who was a vassal of Louis the German, and betrayed him to the Franks. Within a year, however, the Franks also imprisoned Svatopluk. After the Moravians rebelled against the Franks, Svatopluk was released and led the rebels to victory over the invaders. Although he was obliged to pay tribute to East Francia under the peace treaty concluded at Forchheim (Germany) in 874, he was able to expand his territories outside the Franks' sphere of interest in the following years. His forces even invaded the March of Pannonia within East Francia in 882.

Svatopluk established a good relationship with the popes, and he and his people were formally taken under the protection of the Holy See in 880. Pope Stephen V even addressed him as "King" in a letter written in 885. Svatopluk seems to have wanted to appease the German clergy who opposed the conducting of the liturgy in Old Church Slavonic, and he expelled the disciples of Methodius from Moravia in 886, after their teacher's death.

Svatopluk's state was a loose assemblage of principalities and also included conquered territories.

Not long after his death Svatopluk's realm of Great Moravia collapsed in the midst of a power struggle between his sons and the intensifying Hungarian raids.

Svatopluk, whose empire encompassed parts of the territory of modern Czech Republic (Moravia and Bohemia), Slovakia, Poland and Hungary, has occasionally been presented as a "Slovak King" in Slovak literary works since the 18th century, the period of the Slovak national awakening.

Early years 

The Annals of Fulda refer to Svatopluk as a nephew of Rastislav, the second known ruler of Great Moravia. Svatopluk was most probably born around 840. His father's name was Svetimir, according to the late 12th-century Chronicle of the Priest of Duklja, a medieval historical work long dismissed as a collection of fact and fiction. According to the unproven later Moravian tradition of Tomáš Pešina z Čechorodu (17th century), who fulfilled the family tree of the House of Mojmír, Svatopluk was the son of a certain Bogislav. According to Simon of Kéza his father was Morot, a Prince of Poland who had subdued Bractari and occupied Crișana before retiring to Veszprém.

Svatopluk seems to have risen to power in Great Moravia in the early 860s. The Life of Methodius relates that Svatopluk and his uncle jointly asked the Byzantine Emperor Michael III to send missionaries who were familiar with the Slavic tongue to Moravia. Michael III chose two brothers, Cyril and Methodius, who were fluent in the dialect of Slavic spoken in the environs of Thessaloniki (Greece). They arrived in Moravia in 863, and immediately set to work teaching and preaching. Their translation of liturgical texts into Old Church Slavonic was approved by Pope Hadrian II in 867.

Beginning of his reign 

 
By the time Svatopluk first appeared in a Frankish sources (the Annals of Fulda) in 869, he was ruler of his own "realm" (regnum, implying autonomous or semi-autonomous land) within Great Moravia. This is generally accepted to be the Duchy of Nitra. His court was at "Rastislav's old city" (urbs antique Rastizi), which may have been either at Staré Město whose name literally means "old city" in Czech, or at Nitra (today in Slovakia), but it has also been identified with Sirmium (Sremska Mitrovica in Serbia).

Svatopluk's "realm" was invaded and plundered in 869 by Bavarian troops led by Carloman, the eldest son of Louis the German, King of East Francia. At the same time Franconian and Alamannian troops attacked Rastislav's territories under the leadership of the same King's youngest son, Charles the Fat. Although the two armies soon returned, Svatopluk entered into clandestine negotiations with Carloman, and agreed to commend himself and his principality to Carloman.

Having learned of this agreement, Rastislav is said to have become furious and set a trap for his nephew, inviting him to a banquet where he intended to have him murdered. Svatopluk, however, was warned of his uncle's plans, took Rastislav prisoner and handed him over to Carloman. Rastislav was sent to Bavaria under guard, while Carloman annexed his realm outright.

As a reward for capturing Rastislav, Carloman allowed Svatopluk to retain his principality, but the rest of Great Moravia was placed under the control of two Frankish lords, William and Engilschalk. Carloman's forces also captured Methodius, whom Pope Hadrian II had earlier appointed Archbishop of Sirmium with jurisdiction over the realms ruled by Rastislav and Svatopluk. Early in 871 Carloman also imprisoned Svatopluk on unspecified charges of disloyalty, which may have been connected to the rebellion of Carloman's younger brothers, Louis the Younger and Charles the Bald. Believing that Svatopluk was dead, the Moravians selected another member of their ruling family named Slavomír and made him their ruler.

Towards the Peace of Forchheim 

Carloman soon came to the conclusion that the accusations against Svatopluk were unfounded and released him from prison. In order to bind Svatopluk to his family, Carloman had Svatopluk stand as godfather to his illegitimate grandson. Thus this son of Carloman's son Arnulf received the Moravian name Zwentibold.

Svatopluk also agreed to lead Carloman's armies against Slavomír and the rebellious Moravians. However, on his arrival at "Rastislav's old city", Svatopluk betrayed the Bavarians and conspired secretly with the rebels. Although he captured the fortress in accordance with Carloman's plan, once he was inside its walls he renounced his loyalty to Carloman, rallied a large Moravian force and launched a devastating surprise attack on the unsuspecting Bavarian army encamped outside. The Moravians took a great number of soldiers hostage, killed the rest and rid Moravia of the Frankish occupation. Carloman's governors, William and Engelschalk, were also both slain, and Svatopluk became the undisputed ruler of Great Moravia.

In October 871 Louis the German sent Bavarian and Franconian troops against the Bohemians (Czechs). During the campaign the Franconians surprised a party of Moravians somewhere near the traps that guarded the narrow approaches to a Bohemian fort. The Moravians were returning to their homeland with the daughter of a Bohemian dux ("duke"), presumably to marry an unidentified Moravian magnate. Although the Moravians managed to reach the safety of the fort, they had to abandon 644 fully equipped horses in the narrows. The marriage of a Bohemian leader's daughter to a Moravian magnate implies that Svatopluk was planning to form an alliance with the Bohemians.

Louis the German realized the grave threat posed by Svatopluk and assembled forces for a multipronged expedition with pincer movements advancing on Moravian territory from several directions in 872. One army was sent out "against the Moravian Slavs" from Regensburg (Germany) in May, but the Thuringian and Saxon soldiers fled in their first encounter with the enemy. The second army, composed of Franconians under Bishop Arn of Würzburg and Abbot Sigihard of Fulda, experienced mixed results: although their forces fought well, the majority of the men were killed, and only a handful of survivors returned to East Francia. Finally a third force, consisting of Bavarians and Carantanians under Carloman's command, laid Moravian territories to waste, put Svatopluk's army to flight and forced it to take refuge in an "extremely well fortified stronghold". Svatopluk, however, soon assembled a large army and attacked the Bavarians who had been left behind under the command of Bishop Emriacho of Regensburg to guard ships on the bank of the river Danube.

In May 873, Pope John VIII moved energetically to discover the whereabouts of Methodius, who was still being held prisoner in Bavaria. He sent harshly worded letters to Carloman and the Bavarian bishops, and commanded Methodius's immediate reinstatement. The Pope seems also to have brokered a lasting peace between Louis the German and Svatopluk. After his meeting with the Pope at Verona (Italy), Louis the German went to Forchheim where, according to the Annals of Fulda, "he received the legates of Svatopluk asking for a peace treaty". The exact terms of their agreement are not known, but it seems to have been a compromise: Svatopluk was forced to make an annual payment of tribute to Louis the German, who agreed to avoid any hostile acts against Great Moravia. Thus Methodius, who had in the meantime been allowed to return to Moravia, could continue his work in relatively peaceful conditions for some years.

Years of expansion 

Great Moravia underwent considerable expansion in the 870s. For instance, the Life of Methodius refers to the capture of "a very powerful pagan prince settled on the Vistula" in territory of later Poland, and a letter written around 900 by Archbishop Theotmar of Salzburg states that Svatopluk conquered the region of Nitra, which had been thereto inhabited by pagans. Modern historiography, however, has tended to question the claims that huge neighboring territories were permanently annexed by Great Moravia. For instance, there is little clear archaeological or written evidence of a permanent extension of Moravian power in Lesser Poland or to the west in Silesia, or in Pannonia, as is suggested in earlier historical works.

Svatopluk's expansionist policy was perhaps so successful because most of Western Europe was in the grip of unusually savage and large-scale Viking raids between 879 and 886. On the other hand, the Life of Methodius directly links Svatopluk's military achievements and Methodius' work. For instance, according to his Life, Methodius promised Svatopluk that if the Prince would celebrate Saint Peter's Day in the Archbishop's church, "God will soon deliver" his enemies to him, and "so it came to pass".

Nevertheless, at the court of Svatopluk, who himself professed the Latin Rite, intrigues against Methodius and the liturgy in Old Church Slavonic gathered strength. Svatopluk sent John of Venice, a known opponent of the Slavic liturgy, to Rome in 879 to achieve a settlement of ecclesiastical differences. In a letter addressed to Methodius in the same year, the Pope sharply rebuked him for using Slavonic in church services. Methodius, however, travelled to Rome in 880, together with a Moravian delegation. Under his influence Pope John VIII changed his mind and in a letter, known for its incipit, Industriae tuae, the Pope repeated that Mass was to be sung in Latin whenever requested, but he also allowed the use of Slavonic liturgy. The letter also confirmed the decision taken by the Holy See during Rastislav's reign to create an archdiocese for Great Moravia. Upon Svatopluk's request the Pope promoted a German priest, Wiching, to be Bishop of Nitra, but he added that the new Bishop and all the clerics in Great Moravia were expected to be obedient to Methodius, who remained the head of the church in Svatopluk's realms.

The "Wilhelminer War" 

At the time when Charles the Fat became the sole ruler of East Francia in 881, the sons of Wilhelm and Engelschalk, the one-time commanders of the Bavarian forces occupying Moravia in 870–871, began to conspire with various Bavarian magnates in order to eject Arbo, the margrave Louis the German had appointed to command a key part of East Francia's frontier on the Danube. Arbo, however, appealed for and received help from both Charles the Fat and Svatopluk, and even handed his son over to the latter as a hostage.

Upon Arbo's request, Svatopluk, who remembered "how much evil he along with his people had suffered" at the hands of Wilhelm and Engelschalk, attacked their sons. His forces soon captured Engelschalk's second son who was mutilated at Svatopluk's order. Thereafter the remaining sons withdrew from the authority of Charles the Fat and become the men of Carloman's son, Arnulf, who was ruling in Pannonia at that time. Learning of this, Svatopluk sent ambassadors to Arnulf, demanding that the sons of Wilhelm and Engelschalk be immediately sent away. Arnulf, however, refused to hand them over, to which Svatopluk responded with further invasions. In addition to the Franks and Moravians, the Bulgarians also entered the conflict by invading Svatopluk's realm. According to a record in the Annals of Salzburg, the region of Vienna (Austria) was also invaded in 881 by Hungarians. They seem to have been hired either by Svatopluk or by Arnulf in order to intervene in their conflict.

Thus the "Willhelminer War", that was to last until 884, led to the devastation of Pannonia east of the river Rába. Finally, Charles the Fat himself turned up and received Svatopluk as his man at Kaumberg (Germany), receiving promises of peace and fidelity. Svatopluk also promised never to invade Charles the Fat's realm with a hostile force as long as he lived, while Charles the Fat recognized him as a prince of his realm. Peace between Arnulf and Svatopluk, however, was only sealed in the latter part of the following year.

Last years 

Methodius, who seems to have been in Svatopluk's train at Kaumberg, died in 885. In his last days he had indicated Gorazd, one of his Moravian disciples, as most worthy to succeed him. Gorazd, however, did not or could not immediately submit his candidature for ratification of the Holy See, because Bishop Wiching of Nitra soon hurried to Rome. He persuaded Pope Stephen V that Methodius had ignored Pope John VIII's orders in the matter of Slavonic liturgy, and thus, upon his initiative, the pope prohibited the Slavonic liturgy in Moravia. The pope also sent a letter (Quia te zelo) to Svatopluk, urging him to accept the addition of filioque to the Creed and to give up such peculiar Byzantine practices as fasting on Saturday.

Wiching having arrived back from Rome, Svatopluk summoned Gorazd, Clement and Methodius's other disciples to submit to the papal directions. When they refused to do so, Svatopluk gave Wiching a free hand to take action against them. Some of them were first thrown into prison, and soon expelled from Moravia, while others, among them Naum, were sold as slaves. The expulsion of Methodius's disciples from Moravia signaled the end of the Slavonic liturgy in Central Europe. The exiles, however, subsequently found refuge in the First Bulgarian Empire where they were able to carry on their work. Saint Clement of Ochrid said:

In his letter Quia te zelo, the pope addressed Svatopluk as rex Sclavorum ("king of the Slavs"). Although Svatopluk's royal title was not recognized by the contemporary Annals of Fulda, the chronicler Regino of Prüm also referred to Svatopluk as rex Marahensium Sclavorum ("king of the Moravian Slavs") in the early 10th century, which is independent evidence confirming that Svatopluk held the title of king. According to the late 12th-century Chronicle of the Priest of Duklja, Svatopluk had been crowned "king in the Roman fashion on the field of Dalma" in the presence of a papal legate, cardinals, and bishops.

In 887 Arnulf, Svatopluk's opponent in the "Wilhelminer War", became the king of East Francia. They met at Omuntesperch, a locality that has yet not been identified, during the winter of 890. At the meeting Svatopluk transmitted to Arnulf a message from Pope Stephen V, urging the king to invade Italy to protect the Holy See. According to Regino of Prüm, the two monarchs also concluded an agreement, in which Arnulf ceded the ducatus of the Bohemians to Svatopluk.

Sometime during 891, according to the Annals of Fulda, Arnulf sent an embassy led by margrave Arbo to Moravia in order to renew the peace. A letter written by the margrave soon announced that the legates were returning from Svatopluk and the Moravians who had agreed "to give themselves in friendship". Svatopluk, however, broke his pledges, so Arnulf decided to invade Moravia in 891. First the king met with Braslav, the Slavic dux on the river Sava, then raised an army of Franconians, Bavarians and Alamanni, and also recruited Hungarians to join his campaign. In the late 10th century, Arnulf was accused by Ottonian authors of unleashing the Hungarians on Europe because of his desire to bring down Moravia.

Arnulf's invasion started in July 892, but he failed to defeat Svatopluk. The war against Moravia seems to have continued until 894. This was the year of Svatopluk's "most unlucky death", according to the Annals of Fulda, which implies that he met his end in some kind of mishap, the sort that occurs in war. The exact circumstances of Svatopluk's death, however, are unknown.

Simon of Kéza recorded that he died in battle near Környe

Legacy 

Following Svatopluk's death, Great Moravia, which had achieved its maximum territorial extension, and exercised its greatest influence in his reign, ceased to be a political factor in Central Europe. Among the conquered peoples, the Czechs were the first to withdraw in 895. Although—at least, according to the testimony of the Byzantine Emperor Constantine Porphyrogenitus—Svatopluk had made a deathbed request to his sons, Mojmir II of Moravia and Svatopluk II, that they remain united, after his death internal disagreements between them were fostered by Arnulf. Finally Moravia collapsed in the first decade of the 10th century due to the invasion of the Hungarians.

 According to Hungarian legends, the Hungarians purchased the country from Svatopluk in a symbolic act of exchange: they sent a white horse with saddler to Svatopluk in return for some earth, water and grass, supposed to represent his country itself. Svatopluk allegedly disavowed this "contract" and then drowned in the Danube in flight from the Hungarians. The legend, in fact, seems to merely describe a common pagan rite of concluding alliances which might refer to Svatopluk's alliance with the Hungarians in 894.

Historian Ryszard Grzesik says that the ruler Menumorut, mentioned in the 13th-century chronicle Gesta Hungarorum was the "personification" of Svatopluk I of Moravia.

Nevertheless, in 1722 Michael Bencsik, a professor of Hungarian law at the University of Trnava, suggested that the nobility and the whole population of Trencsén county within the Kingdom of Hungary were "the remnants of Svatopluk who sold his country to the Hungarians, and thus the Slovak people, into eternal serfdom". In response, Ján Baltazár Magin, the Roman Catholic pastor of Dubnica, wrote the oldest known defense of the Slovak nation in 1728. Next another Catholic priest, Juraj Fándly, completed a history in Latin entitled Compendiata historia gentis Slavae ("A Brief History of the Slovak Nation") in which he depicted Moravia as a state of Slovaks and Svatopluk as their king. In 1833 the poet Ján Hollý published a poem entitled Svätopluk, the first of a series of epic poems dealing with the past of the Slovak people.

See also 
Alternative theories of the location of Great Moravia
Arnulf of Carinthia
Great Moravia
Louis the German
Mojmir II
Saints Cyril and Methodius
Svatopluk II

Notes

References 

 
 
 
 
 

 
 
 
 
 
 
 
 
 
 
 
Skvarna, Dusan; Bartl, Július; Cicaj, Viliam; Kohutova, Maria; Letz, Robert; Seges, Vladimir (2002). Slovak History: Chronology & Lexicon. Bolchazy-Carducci Publishers. .
Sommer, Petr; Třeštík, Dušan; Žemlička, Josef; Opačić, Zoë (2007). Bohemia and Moravia. In: Berend, Nora (2007); Christianization and the Rise of Christian Monarchy: Scandinavia, Central Europe and Rus’, c. 900–1200; Cambridge University Press; .
Spiesz, Anton; Caplovic, Dusan; Bolchazy, Ladislaus J. (2006). Illustrated Slovak History: A Struggle for Sovereignty in Central Europe. Bolchazy-Carducci Publishers, Inc. .
Squatriti, Paolo (2007). The Complete Works of Liudprand of Cremona. The Catholic University of America Press. .
 

9th-century births
894 deaths
9th-century rulers in Europe
Great Moravia
People from Nitra
9th-century Slavs
9th-century people from East Francia
Slavic warriors